Mona Ali Mohamed Zaki (born 18 November 1976) is an Egyptian actress.

Biography 
Mona Zaki was born to her parents Ali Mohamed Zaki and Tahani on November 18, 1976. Until the age of 13, she lived in Kuwait. At the age of 16, and after seeing an advertisement by Mohamed Sobhi for new faces, she applied merely in hope of getting a chance to meet the famous Egyptian actor and director. Zaki was cast by Sobhi and had her first acting role in his play Bel Araby El Faseeh.

Mona spent one semester in the United States studying in New Orleans under the tutelage of Dr. Malak Abou-Hargah. She returned to Egypt though to continue her acting career.

When it was time for Mona to go to university, she enrolled in the Faculty of Mass Communication, Cairo University. During that time, she was introduced to director Ismail Abdel Hafez who chose her to play a part in El A'elah, a Ramadan series that marked her TV debut.

Acting became more than just a hobby to Mona after that; she later acted in a number of popular TV series: Khalti Safiya wel Deir, Nisf Rabi' El Akhar, Ahalina, Ded El Tayyar and El Daw' El Sharid.

The promising star's TV roles opened the doors of the big screen for her. Mona invaded the cinema with El Katl ElLaziz, with Mervat Amin, then went on to play lead roles in Idhak El Soura Titla' Hilwa a performance for which she received an award, Sa'idi fil Gam'a Al-Amrikiya, Omar 2000, El Hobb El Awal, and Leih Khallitni Ahibbak all of which were box office hits.

She played the role of Jehan Sadat in the masterpiece The Days of Sadat (about Egyptian President Anwar Sadat). The young actress was given an award, along with the rest of the cast of the movie, by President Hosni Mubarak.

Success remained close to the talented star and her dedication was well rewarded with the huge popularity of her next movies, Africano and Mafia. She went on from one movie to another, presenting Sleepless Nights, Men Nazret Ein, Khalti Faransa, and many more.

Despite her huge success in the cinema, Mona also acted in several plays, among which were Le'b Eyal, Ya Messafer Wahdak, Afrouto, and Keda OK.

Personal life 
Mona is married to Egyptian actor Ahmed Helmy. They have three children: Lilly (2003), Selim (2014), and Younis (2016).

Charity work 
Mona Zaki is preparing to take part in the new charity campaign Know your Blood type. The Al-Ahram newspaper reports that the campaign was launched by Mona Zaki as Yanabee El-Hayah ambassador in coordination with Yanabee El-Hayah for blood donation and in cooperation with the United Nations public health arm, the World Health Organization.

Filmography

Series 
 Asia = Asia
 El Ailah = The Family
 Cindrella = Cindrella
 Zizinia = Zizinia 
 Ahalina = Our Kins 
 El Du El Shared = The Stay Light
 Goha El Masri = Egyptian Goha
 Lahazat Haregah = Critical Trices
 Layali El Helmiyyah 5 = Nights Of El Helmiyyah - Part 5
 Be 100 Ragel = Equal 100 Man
 SNL Arabic
 Afrah El Qobbah = Joy Of El Qobbah
 Le’bet Newton = Newton’s Cradle on Netflix with Mayan El Sayed

Theatre 
 B El Arabi El Fasih = By Fluent Arabic
 Ya Msafer Wahdak = O Traveling Alone
 Kedah OK = So Ok
 Afrotto = Demon

References

External links 

 
 

1976 births
Living people
Egyptian film actresses
Egyptian television actresses
Egyptian stage actresses
20th-century Egyptian actresses
21st-century Egyptian actresses
Actresses from Cairo